Dimma may refer to:

Dimma (woreda), a woreda in the Gambela Region of Ethiopia
Book of Dimma, 8th-century Irish pocket Gospel Book
William Dimma (born 1928), Canadian businessperson 
Etiyé Dimma Poulsen (born 1968), Ethiopian-born Danish/Belgian sculptor
Dimma (band), Icelandic metal band